General Hall may refer to:

Charles P. Hall (1886–1953), U.S. Army lieutenant general
Elmer E. Hall (1890–1958), U.S. Marine Corps brigadier general
Gage John Hall (c.1775–1854), British Army general
Herman Hall (1864–1928), U.S. Army brigadier general
James R. Hall (born 1936), U.S. Army lieutenant general
Jonathan Hall (British Army officer) (born 1944), British Army major general
Julian Hall (1837–1911), British Army lieutenant general
William Evens Hall (1907–1984), U.S. Air Force lieutenant general
William Preble Hall (1848–1927), U.S. Army brigadier general

See also
General Hall, an imprint of publishing company Rowman & Littlefield
Attorney General Hall (disambiguation)